Jim McDonald CBE, LVO, KCSG, GCHS, JP, DL was a Northern Irish Catholic Unionist.

McDonald served as the first Chairman of the Royal Ulster Constabulary George Cross Foundation and Chancellor of the Papal Orders in Ireland. 

McDonald was born and raised in a devoutly Catholic family off the Falls Road close to Clonard Monastery in  West Belfast, a nationalist/republican stronghold.

References

1930s births
Living people
Catholic Unionists
People from Belfast
People educated at St. Mary's Christian Brothers' Grammar School, Belfast
Knights Grand Cross of the Order of St Gregory the Great
Knights of the Holy Sepulchre
Lieutenants of the Royal Victorian Order
Date of birth missing (living people)